Osbourne Store is a settlement in Jamaica. It had a population of 3932 as of 2009.

References

Populated places in Clarendon Parish, Jamaica